Romania first participated at the Olympic Games in 1900, with a single participant. The National Olympic Committee for Romania is the Romanian Olympic and Sports Committee, and was created and recognized in 1914.  The nation first sent a team to compete at the Games in 1924, and has only missed two editions each of the Summer Olympic Games and Winter Olympic Games since then. Notably, Romania was the lone Eastern Bloc nation to participate at the 1984 Summer Olympics, which the other nations boycotted. That was also Romania's most successful Olympic Games: they won 20 gold medals and 53 medals in total.

Gymnastics is Romania's top medal-producing sport. Romania has won the third highest total number of medals (after Hungary, and Poland) of nations that have never hosted the Games.

History
From the 1972 Summer Olympics through the 2012 Summer Olympics, Romania had qualified a women's team for the gymnastics team all-around. They had won medals at every Olympics from the 1976 Summer Olympics through to the 2012 Summer Games. However the women's team failed to qualify for the 2016 Summer Olympics, ending the 40-year run in medals, and the 44-year run of having a team at the Olympics.

At the winter Olympics Romania won only one medal, at the 1968 Winter Olympics with two-man bobsleigh team led by Ion Panțuru and Nicolae Neagoe.

Medal tables

Medals by Summer Games

Medals by Winter Games

Medals by summer sport

Medals by winter sport

Medallists

Summer medallists with minimum 2 gold

Winter medallists

Summary by sport

Shooting

Romania's only appearance before 1924 was a single shooter at the 1900 Games, when Gheorghe Plagino placed 13th in the trap.

See also
 List of flag bearers for Romania at the Olympics
 :Category:Olympic competitors for Romania
 Romania at the Paralympics
 Sport in Romania

References

External links